This is a list of radio stations that broadcast on FM frequency 106.6 MHz:

China 
 CNR Business Radio in Guangzhou
 CNR Music Radio in Qujing
 CNR Story Radio in Beijing

Indonesia
 V Radio 106.6 FM in Jakarta, Capital Special Region, Indonesia

United Kingdom
 106.6 Smooth Radio in Nottingham
 BCB 106.6fm in Bradford, West Yorkshire
 Time 106.6 in East Berkshire and South Buckinghamshire
 Two Lochs Radio 106.6 in Wester Ross (Poolewe relay)
 Wycombe Sound in High Wycombe, South Buckinghamshire
 North Manchester FM 106.6 in Manchester
 Imagine Radio in Peak District
 Koast Radio 106.6FM in South East Northumberland

References

Lists of radio stations by frequency